GBA-15 (Diamer-I) is a constituency of Gilgit Baltistan Assembly which is currently represented by Haji Shah Baig.

Members

Election results

2009
Bashir Ahmed Pakistan Muslim League (Q) became member of assembly by getting 2,356 votes.

2015
Haji Shah Baig of Jamiat Ulema-e-Islam (F) won this seat by getting 3,713 votes.

References

Gilgit-Baltistan Legislative Assembly constituencies